Crasna is a commune in Gorj County, Oltenia, Romania. It is composed of nine villages: Aninișu din Deal, Aninișu din Vale, Buzești, Cărpiniș, Crasna, Crasna din Deal, Drăgoiești, Dumbrăveni and Radoși.

References

Communes in Gorj County
Localities in Oltenia